Davao Occidental Tigers, also known as Davao Occidental Tigers Cocolife due to sponsorship reasons, are a professional basketball team in the Maharlika Pilipinas Basketball League (MPBL) and the Pilipinas Super League.

History
In 2018, the Tigers joined the MPBL. After the team won the 2019–20 MPBL Lakan Cup championship in 2021, the team left the MPBL to become one of the founding members of the Pilipinas Super League. It also joined the Filbasket.

In January 2022, the Tigers secured a franchise to participate in the ASEAN Basketball League.

Current roster

Head coaches

MPBL records

References

 
2018 establishments in the Philippines
Basketball teams established in 2018
Maharlika Pilipinas Basketball League teams